Woman Playing a Guitar (French – Femme jouant de la guitare, Joueuse de guitare ou La Guitariste) is an 1897 painting by Pierre-Auguste Renoir, now in the Museum of Fine Arts of Lyon, which bought it in 1901.

Renoir painted several paintings of guitar-players and borrowing classical motifs – here, he is influenced by Camille Corot, Titian and Rubens. The work was one of the first paintings acquired by Paul Durand-Ruel.

References

Paintings by Pierre-Auguste Renoir
1897 paintings
Musical instruments in art
Paintings in the collection of the Museum of Fine Arts of Lyon